Levinellidae is a family of calcareous sponges in the order Clathrinida. It contains the following genera and species:
 Genus Burtonulla Borojevic & Boury-Esnault, 1986
 Burtonulla sibogae Borojevic & Boury-Esnault, 1986
 Genus Levinella Borojevic & Boury-Esnault, 1986
 Levinella prolifera (Dendy, 1913)
 Levinella thalassae Borojevic & Boury-Esnault, 1986
 Genus Sycettaga Haeckel, 1872
 Sycettaga primitiva Haeckel, 1872

References

Clathrinida